Lilium is a genus of herbaceous flowering plants growing from bulbs, all with large prominent flowers. They are the true lilies. Lilies are a group of flowering plants which are important in culture and literature in much of the world. Most species are native to the northern hemisphere and their range is temperate climates and extends into the subtropics. Many other plants have "lily" in their common names, but do not belong to the same genus and are therefore not true lilies.

Description

They form naked or tunicless scaly underground bulbs which are their organs of perennation. In some North American species the base of the bulb develops into rhizomes, on which numerous small bulbs are found. Some species develop stolons. Most bulbs are buried deep in the ground, but a few species form bulbs near the soil surface. Many species form stem-roots. With these, the bulb grows naturally at some depth in the soil, and each year the new stem puts out adventitious roots above the bulb as it emerges from the soil. These roots are in addition to the basal roots that develop at the base of the bulb, a number of species also produce contractile roots that move the bulbs deeper into the soil.

The flowers are large, often fragrant, and come in a wide range of colors including whites, yellows, oranges, pinks, reds and purples. Markings include spots and brush strokes. The plants are late spring- or summer-flowering. Flowers are borne in racemes or umbels at the tip of the stem, with six tepals spreading or reflexed, to give flowers varying from funnel shape to a "Turk's cap". The tepals are free from each other, and bear a nectary at the base of each flower. The ovary is 'superior', borne above the point of attachment of the anthers. The fruit is a three-celled capsule.

Seeds ripen in late summer. They exhibit varying and sometimes complex germination patterns, many adapted to cool temperate climates.

Most cool temperate species are deciduous and dormant in winter in their native environment. But a few species native to areas with hot summers and mild winters (Lilium candidum, Lilium catesbaei, Lilium longiflorum) lose their leaves and enter a short dormant period in summer or autumn, sprout from autumn to winter, forming dwarf stems bearing a basal rosette of leaves until, after they have received sufficient chilling, the stem begins to elongate in warming weather.

The basic chromosome number is twelve (n=12).

Taxonomy
Taxonomical division in sections follows the classical division of Comber, species acceptance follows the World Checklist of Selected Plant Families, the taxonomy of section Pseudolirium is from the Flora of North America, the taxonomy of Section Liriotypus is given in consideration of Resetnik et al. 2007, the taxonomy of Chinese species (various sections) follows the Flora of China and the taxonomy of Section Sinomartagon follows Nishikawa et al. as does the taxonomy of Section Archelirion.

The World Checklist of Selected Plant Families, considers Nomocharis a separate genus in its own right, however some authorities consider Nomocharis to be embedded within Lilium, rather than treat it as a separate genus. The Sinomartagon are divided in 3 paraphyletic groups, while the Leucolirion are divided in 2 paraphyletic groups.

There are seven sections:
Martagon
Pseudolirium
Liriotypus
Archelirion
Sinomartagon
Leucolirion
Daurolirion

There are 111 species counted in this genus. For a full list of accepted species with their native ranges, see List of Lilium species.

Some species formerly included within this genus have now been placed in other genera. These genera include Cardiocrinum, Notholirion, Nomocharis and Fritillaria.

Etymology
The botanic name Lilium is the Latin form and is a Linnaean name. The Latin name is derived from the Greek word  leírion, generally assumed to refer to true, white lilies as exemplified by the Madonna lily. The word was borrowed from Coptic (dial. Fayyumic) , from standard , from Demotic , from Egyptian  "flower". Meillet maintains that both the Egyptian and the Greek word are possible loans from an extinct, substratum language of the Eastern Mediterranean.

The term "lily" has in the past been applied to numerous flowering plants, often with only superficial resemblance to the true lily, including water lily, fire lily, lily of the Nile, calla lily, trout lily, kaffir lily, cobra lily, lily of the valley, daylily, ginger lily, Amazon lily, leek lily, Peruvian lily, and others. All English translations of the Bible render the Hebrew shūshan, shōshan, shōshannā as "lily", but the "lily among the thorns" of Song of Solomon, for instance, may be the honeysuckle.

Distribution and habitat

In the New World they extend from southern Canada through much of the United States. They are commonly adapted to either woodland habitats, often montane, or sometimes to grassland habitats. A few can survive in marshland and epiphytes are known in tropical southeast Asia. In general they prefer moderately acidic or lime-free soils.

Ecology
Lilies are used as food plants by the larvae of some Lepidoptera species including the Dun-bar.

The proliferation of deer (e.g. Odocoileus virginianus) in North America, mainly due to factors such as the elimination of large predators for human safety, is responsible there for a downturn in lily populations in the wild and is a threat to garden lilies as well. Fences as high as 8 feet may be required to prevent them from consuming the plants, an impractical solution for most wild areas.

Cultivation
Many species are widely grown in the garden in temperate, sub-tropical and tropical regions. Numerous ornamental hybrids have been developed. They are used in herbaceous borders, woodland and shrub plantings, and as patio plants. Some lilies, especially Lilium longiflorum, form important cut flower crops or potted plants. These are forced to flower outside of the normal flowering season for particular markets; for instance, Lilium longiflorum for the Easter trade, when it may be called the Easter lily.

Lilies are usually planted as bulbs in the dormant season. They are best planted in a south-facing (northern hemisphere), slightly sloping aspect, in sun or part shade, at a depth 2½ times the height of the bulb (except Lilium candidum which should be planted at the surface). Most prefer a porous, loamy soil, and good drainage is essential. Most species bloom in July or August (northern hemisphere). The flowering periods of certain lily species begin in late spring, while others bloom in late summer or early autumn. They have contractile roots which pull the plant down to the correct depth, therefore it is better to plant them too shallowly than too deep. A soil pH of around 6.5 is generally safe. Most grow best in well-drained soils, and plants are watered during the growing season. Some species and cultivars have strong wiry stems, but those with heavy flower heads are staked to stay upright.

Awards
The following lily species and cultivars currently hold the Royal Horticultural Society's Award of Garden Merit (confirmed 2017):

African Queen Group (VI-/a) 2002 H6
'Casa Blanca' (VIIb/b-c) 1993 H6
'Fata Morgana' (Ia/b) 2002 H6 
'Garden Party' (VIIb/b) 2002 H6
Golden Splendor Group (VIb-c/a) 
Lilium henryi (IXc/d) 1993 H6 
 Lilium mackliniae (IXc/a) 2012 H5
 Lilium martagon – Turk's cap lily (IXc/d) 
 Lilium pardalinum – leopard lily (IXc/d) 
Pink Perfection Group (VIb/a) 
 Lilium regale – regal lily, king's lily (IXb/a)

Classification of garden forms
Numerous forms, mostly hybrids, are grown for the garden. They vary according to the species and interspecific hybrids that they derived from, and are classified in the following broad groups:

Asiatic hybrids (Division I)

 These are derived from hybrids between species in Lilium section Sinomartagon.
 They are derived from central and East Asian species and interspecific hybrids, including Lilium amabile, Lilium bulbiferum, Lilium callosum, Lilium cernuum, Lilium concolor, Lilium dauricum, Lilium davidii, Lilium × hollandicum, Lilium lancifolium (syn. Lilium tigrinum), Lilium lankongense, Lilium leichtlinii, Lilium × maculatum, Lilium pumilum, Lilium × scottiae, Lilium wardii and Lilium wilsonii.
 These are plants with medium-sized, upright or outward facing flowers, mostly unscented. There are various cultivars such as Lilium 'Cappuccino', Lilium 'Dimension', Lilium 'Little Kiss' and Lilium 'Navona'.
 Dwarf (Patio, Border) varieties are much shorter, c.36–61 cm     in height and were designed for containers. They often bear the cultivar name 'Tiny', such as the 'Lily Looks' series, e.g. 'Tiny Padhye', 'Tiny Dessert'.

Martagon hybrids (Division II)

These are based on Lilium dalhansonii, Lilium hansonii, Lilium martagon, Lilium medeoloides, and Lilium tsingtauense.
The flowers are nodding, Turk's cap style (with the petals strongly recurved).

Candidum (Euro-Caucasian) hybrids (Division III)

 This includes mostly European species: Lilium candidum, Lilium chalcedonicum, Lilium kesselringianum, Lilium monadelphum, Lilium pomponium, Lilium pyrenaicum and Lilium × testaceum.

American hybrids (Division IV)
 These are mostly taller growing forms, originally derived from Lilium bolanderi, Lilium × burbankii, Lilium canadense, Lilium columbianum, Lilium grayi, Lilium humboldtii, Lilium kelleyanum, Lilium kelloggii, Lilium maritimum, Lilium michauxii, Lilium michiganense, Lilium occidentale, Lilium × pardaboldtii, Lilium pardalinum, Lilium parryi, Lilium parvum, Lilium philadelphicum, Lilium pitkinense, Lilium superbum, Lilium ollmeri, Lilium washingtonianum,  and Lilium wigginsii.
Many are clump-forming perennials with rhizomatous rootstocks.

Longiflorum hybrids (Division V)
 These are cultivated forms of this species and its subspecies.
They are most important as plants for cut flowers, and are less often grown in the garden than other hybrids.

Trumpet lilies (Division VI), including Aurelian hybrids (with L. henryi)

 This group includes hybrids of many Asiatic species and their interspecific hybrids, including Lilium × aurelianense, Lilium brownii, Lilium × centigale, Lilium henryi, Lilium × imperiale, Lilium × kewense, Lilium leucanthum, Lilium regale, Lilium rosthornii, Lilium sargentiae, Lilium sulphureum and Lilium × sulphurgale.
The flowers are trumpet shaped, facing outward or somewhat downward, and tend to be strongly fragrant, often especially night-fragrant.

Oriental hybrids (Division VII)

 These are based on hybrids within Lilium section Archelirion,  specifically Lilium auratum and Lilium speciosum, together with crossbreeds from several species native to Japan, including Lilium nobilissimum, Lilium rubellum, Lilium alexandrae, and Lilium japonicum.
They are fragrant, and the flowers tend to be outward facing. Plants tend to be tall, and the flowers may be quite large. The whole group are sometimes referred to as "stargazers" because many of them appear to look upwards. (For the specific cultivar, see Lilium 'Stargazer'.)

Other hybrids (Division VIII)

 Includes all other garden hybrids.

Species (Division IX)
 All natural species and naturally occurring forms are included in this group.

The flowers can be classified by flower aspect and form:
 Flower aspect:
a up-facing
b out-facing
c down-facing
 Flower form:
a trumpet-shaped
b bowl-shaped
c flat (or with tepal tips recurved)
d tepals strongly recurved (with the Turk's cap form as the ultimate state)

Many newer commercial varieties are developed by using new technologies such as ovary culture and embryo rescue.

Pests and diseases

Aphids may infest plants.  Leatherjackets feed on the roots.  Larvae of the Scarlet lily beetle can cause serious damage to the stems and leaves.  The scarlet beetle lays its eggs and completes its life cycle only on true lilies (Lilium) and fritillaries (Fritillaria).  Oriental, rubrum, tiger and trumpet lilies as well as Oriental trumpets (orienpets) and Turk's cap lilies and native North American Lilium species are all vulnerable, but the beetle prefers some types over others.  The beetle could also be having an effect on native Canadian species and some rare and endangered species found in northeastern North America. Daylilies (Hemerocallis, not true lilies) are excluded from this category. Plants can suffer from damage caused by mice, deer and squirrels.  Slugs, snails and millipedes attack seedlings, leaves and flowers.

Brown spots on damp leaves may signal an infection of Botrytis elliptica, also known as Lily blight, lily fire, and botrytis leaf blight. Various viral diseases can cause mottling of leaves and stunting of growth, including lily curl stripe, ringspot, and lily rosette virus.

Propagation and growth
Lilies can be propagated in several ways;
 by division of the bulbs
 by growing-on bulbils which are adventitious bulbs formed on the stem
 by scaling, for which whole scales are detached from the bulb and planted to form a new bulb
 by seed; there are many seed germination patterns, which can be complex
 by micropropagation techniques (which include tissue culture); commercial quantities of lilies are often propagated in vitro and then planted out to grow into plants large enough to sell. A highly efficient technique for multiple shoot and propagule formation was given by Yadav et al., in 2013.

Plant grow regulators(PGRs) are used to limit the height of lilies, especial those sold as potted plants; commonly used chemicals include ancymidol, fluprimidol, paclobutrazol, and uni-conazole, which are applied to the foliage and retard the biosynthesis of gibberellins, a class of plant hormones responsible for stem growth.

Research

A comparison of meiotic crossing-over (recombination) in lily and mouse led, in 1977, to the conclusion that diverse eukaryotes share a common pattern of meiotic crossing-over. Lilium longiflorum has been used for studying aspects of the basic molecular mechanism of genetic recombination during meiosis.

Toxicity
Some Lilium species are toxic to cats. This is known to be so especially for Lilium longiflorum, though other Lilium and the unrelated Hemerocallis can also cause the same symptoms. The true mechanism of toxicity is undetermined, but it involves damage to the renal tubular epithelium (composing the substance of the kidney and secreting, collecting, and conducting urine), which can cause acute kidney failure. Veterinary help should be sought, as a matter of urgency, for any cat that is suspected of eating any part of a lily – including licking pollen that may have brushed onto its coat.

Culinary uses

Chinese cuisine
Lily bulbs are starchy and edible as root vegetables, though bulbs of some species may be too bitter to eat.

Lilium brownii var. viridulum, known as 百合 (pak hop), is one of the most prominent edible lilies in China. Its bulbs are large in size and not bitter. They were even exported and sold in the San Francisco Chinatown in the 19th century, available both fresh and dry. A landrace called 龍牙百合 mainly cultivated in Hunan and Jiangxi is especially renowned for its good-quality bulbs.

L. lancifolium is widely cultivated in China, especially in Yixing, Huzhou and Longshan. Its bulbs are slightly bitter.

L. davidii var. unicolor is mainly cultivated in Lanzhou and its bulbs are valued for sweetness.

Other edible Chinese lilies include L. brownii var. brownii, L. davidii var. davidii, L. concolor, L. pensylvanicum, L. distichum, L. martagon var. pilosiusculum, L. pumilum, L. rosthornii and L. speciosum var. gloriosoides. Researchers have also explored the possibility of using ornamental cultivars as edible lilies.

The dried bulbs are commonly used in the south to flavor soup. They may be reconstituted and stir-fried, grated and used to thicken soup, or processed to extract starch. Their texture and taste draw comparisons with the potato, although the individual bulb scales are much smaller.

The commonly marketed "lily" flower buds, called 金针菜 (kam cham tsoi) in Chinese cuisine, are actually from daylilies, Hemerocallis citrina, or possibly H. fulva. Flowers of the H. graminea and Lilium bulbiferum were reported to have been eaten as well, but samples provided by the informant were strictly daylilies and did not include L. bulbiferum.

Lily flowers and bulbs are eaten especially in the summer, for their perceived ability to reduce internal heat. A 19th century English source reported that "Lily flowers are also said to be efficacious in pulmonary affections, and to have tonic properties".

Asiatic lily cultivars are also imported from the Netherlands; the seedling bulbs must be imported from the Netherlands every year.

The parts of Lilium species which are officially listed as food material in Taiwan are the flower and bulbs of Lilium lancifolium, Lilium brownii var. viridulum, Lilium pumilum and Lilium candidum.

Japanese cuisine

The lily bulb or yuri-ne is sometimes used in Japanese cuisine. It may be most familiar in the present day as an occasional  in the chawan-mushi (savoury egg custard), where a few loosened scales of this optional ingredient are found embedded in the "hot pudding" of each serving.

The boiled bulb may also be strained into purée for use, as in the sweetened kinton, or chakin-shibori.

Yokan
There is also the yuri-yōkan, one recipe of which calls for combining measures of yuri starch with agar dissolved in water and sugar. This was a specialty of Hamada, Shimane, and the shop  established in 1885 became famous for it. Because a certain Viscount Jimyōin wrote a waka poem about the confection which mentioned hime-yuri "princess lily", one source stated that the hime-yuri (usually taken to mean L. concolor) had to have been used, but another source points out that the city of Hamada lies back to back with across a mountain range with Fuchu, Hiroshima which is renowned for its production of yama-yuri  (L. auratum).

Species used

Current Japanese governmental sources (c. 2005) list the following lily species as prominent in domestic consumption: the oni yuri or tiger lily Lilium lancifolium, the kooni yuri Lilium leichtlinii var. maximowiczii, and the gold-banded white yama-yuri L. auratum.

But Japanese sources c. 1895–1900, give a top-three list which replaces kooni yuri with the  named from the gaps between the tepals.

There is uncertainty regarding which species is meant by the hime-yuri used as food, because although this is usually the common name for L. concolor in most up-to-date literature, it used to ambiguously referred to the tiger lily as well, c. 1895–1900. The non-tiger-lily himeyuri is certainly described as quite palatable in the literature at the time, but the extent of exploitation could not have been as significant.

North America
The flower buds and roots of Lilium canadense are traditionally gathered and eaten by North American indigenous peoples. Coast Salish, Nuu-chah-nulth and most western Washington peoples steam, boil or pit-cook the bulbs of Lilium columbianum. Bitter or peppery-tasting, they were mostly used as a flavoring, often in soup with meat or fish.

Medicinal uses
Traditional Chinese medicine list the use of the following: 野百合 Lilium brownii, 百合 Lilium brownii var. viridulum, 渥丹 Lilium concolor, 毛百合 Lilium dauricum, 卷丹 Lilium lancifolium, 山丹 Lilium pumilum, 南川百合 Lilium rosthornii, 药百合Lilium speciosum var. gloriosoides, 淡黄花百合 Lilium sulphureum

In Taiwan, governmental publications list Lilium lancifolium Thunb., Lilium brownii var. viridulum Baker, Lilium pumilum DC.

In South Korea, the lilium species which are officially listed for medicinal use are 참나리 Lilium lancifolium Thunberg; 당나리 Lilium brownii var. viridulun Baker;

In culture

Symbolism
In the Victorian language of flowers, lilies portray love, ardor, and affection for your loved ones, while orange lilies stand for happiness, love, and warmth.

Lilies are the flowers most commonly used at funerals, where they symbolically signify that the soul of the deceased has been restored to the state of innocence.

Lilium formosanum, or Taiwanese lily, is called "the flower of broken bowl" by the elderly members of the Hakka ethnic group. They believe that because this lily grows near bodies of clean water, harming the lily may damage the environment, just like breaking the bowls that people rely on. An alternative explanation is that parents convince children into not taking the lily by convincing the children that their dinner bowls may break if they destroy this flower.

In Western Christianity, Madonna lily or Lilium candidum has been associated with the Virgin Mary since at least the Medieval Era. Medieval and Renaissance depictions of the Virgin Mary, especially at the Annunciation, often show her with these flowers. Madonna lilies are also commonly included in depictions of Christ's resurrection. Lilium longiflorum, the Easter lily, is a symbol of Easter, and  Lilium candidum, the Madonna lily, carries a great deal of symbolic value in many cultures. See the articles for more information.

Heraldry

The fleur-de-lis, associated primarily with French royalty, is a stylized lily flower.

Lilium bulbiferum has long been recognised as a symbol of the Orange Order in Northern Ireland.

Lilium mackliniae is the state flower of Manipur. Lilium michauxii, the Carolina lily, is the official state flower of North Carolina. Idyllwild, California, hosts the Lemon Lily Festival, which celebrates Lilium parryi. Lilium philadelphicum is the floral emblem of Saskatchewan province in Canada, and is on the flag of Saskatchewan.

Other plants referred to as lilies
Lily of the valley, flame lilies, daylilies, and water lilies are symbolically important flowers commonly referred to as lilies, but they are not in the genus Lilium.

See also
 Lily seed germination types
 List of plants known as lily

Explanatory notes

References
Citations

Bibliography

 
 
 
 Seika-en Sanjin 精花園山人 "Hana-yuri 花百合", in

External links

 The Plant List
 Online Lily Register, over 9400 entries Lilium
 North American Lily Society
 Royal Horticultural Society Lily Group
 1 2 3 Time-lapse videos
 THE GENUS LILIUM
 
 Lily perenialization, Flower Bulb Research Program, Department of Horticulture, Cornell University
 Crossing polygon of the genus Lilium.
 Bulb flower production »  Lilies, International Flower Bulb Centre
 Lily Picture Book, International Flower Bulb Centre

Flora
 Flora Europaea: Lilium
 Flora of China: Lilium
 Flora of Nepal: Lilium species list
 Flora of North America: Lilium

 
Bulbous plants
Garden plants
Liliaceae genera
Root vegetables
Taxa named by Carl Linnaeus